Candy Apples (born October 3, 1976) is an American pornographic actress.

Career
Apples was still living at home with her parents when she started making movies at age 19 (in 1995) at an adult film production company. She has stated that she makes "up to $2,000 per scene" in adult movies.

She has appeared several times on the Howard Stern TV and radio shows, and she has been in a Rolling Stones video shoot in Las Vegas at the request of one of her fans, Keith Richards. She has also appeared as herself on the Jerry Springer show.

Gangbang world record
On October 9, 1999, Apples became the world gangbang record holder, which used to be held by porn star Houston, with 742 "instances of sex", including oral sex and strap-on use. She was aiming for over 2,000, but the gangbang was eventually halted by a Los Angeles Police raid. She was originally going to marry her then fiancé, now husband, at the end of the gangbang.

Awards and nominations
 2001 AVN Award nominee – Best Solo Sex Scene (Candy Apples vs. King Dong - Notorious/Multimedia)
 2001 AVN Award nominee – Best All-Girl Sex Scene, Video (Violation of Bridgette Kerkove - JM Productions) with Bridgette Kerkove, Coral Sands, Daisy Chain, Gwen Summers, Layla Jade & Vivi Anne

References

External links
 
 
 
 Excalibur Films profile

1976 births
Living people
American pornographic film actresses
Pornographic film actors from California
Actresses from Inglewood, California
21st-century American women